Beguea is a genus of flowering plants belonging to the family Sapindaceae.

Its native range is Madagascar.

Species:

Beguea ankeranensis 
Beguea apetala 
Beguea australis 
Beguea betamponensis 
Beguea birkinshawii 
Beguea borealis 
Beguea galokensis 
Beguea tsaratananensis 
Beguea turkii 
Beguea vulgaris

References

Sapindaceae
Sapindaceae genera
Taxa named by René Paul Raymond Capuron